Senator Lessard may refer to:

Alton A. Lessard (1909–1976), Maine State Senate
Bob Lessard (born 1931), Minnesota State Senate